William Siew Wai Lim (19 July 1932 – 6 January 2023) was a Singaporean architect. Some of his noted designs included People's Park Complex (1973), the Golden Mile Complex (1974); and the Tanglin Shopping Center, all in Singapore. Lim wrote and lectured on a wide range of subjects relating to architecture, urbanism, and culture in Asia as well as on current issues relating to the postmodern, glocality and social justice. He was the author of Asian Alterity: With Special Reference to Architecture and Urbanism through The Lens of Cultural Studies (2008), as well as editor of Asian Design Culture (2009) and co-editor of Non West Modernist Past (2011).

Early life 
Lim was born in 1932 in Hong Kong. He graduated from the Architectural Association School of Architecture in London and continued his graduate studies at Harvard University. He was a Fulbright Fellow in the Department of City and Regional Planning at Harvard University, and returned to Singapore in 1957 after his studies.

Career 
Lim started his career in 1957, working in Singapore and Malaysia in several businesses as a partner. His work began with the design of modernist structures for residential and commercial interests, and progressed to large-scale shopping centres in Singapore and Kuala Lumpur. His designs include the People's Park Complex (1973) in Singapore, which went on to become the model for commercial development in the city, the Golden Mile Complex (1974), and the Tanglin Shopping Center. In 1981, he started his own business. He was a founding member of the Singapore Heritage Society and a co-founder and chairman of Asian Urban Lab and President of the Architectural Association of Asia (AA Asia). He was conferred a Doctor of Architecture Honoris Causa by the Royal Melbourne Institute of Technology (RMIT) University, Australia, in 2002 and appointed Honorary Professor of LaSalle-SIA College of the Arts (Singapore) in 2005.

Lim wrote and lectured on a wide range of subjects relating to architecture, urbanism, and culture in Asia as well as on current issues relating to the postmodern, glocality, and social justice. He was the author of Asian Alterity: With Special Reference to Architecture and Urbanism through The Lens of Cultural Studies (2008), as well as editor of Asian Design Culture (2009) and co-editor of Non West Modernist Past (2011).

Personal life 
Lim was married to Madam Lena Lim. The couple had two children, a son and a daughter.

Lim died on 7 January 2023 at home in Holland Road in Singapore at age 90. He had suffered from COVID-19 in late-2022.

Projects
Source(s):
1973 People's Park Complex, Singapore
1974 Golden Mile Complex, Singapore
1980 Tanglin Shopping Centre, Singapore
1987 Church of Our Saviour (conversion), Singapore
1999 Marine Parade Community Building, Singapore
2000 Gallery Hotel, Singapore

Books

Notes

References

External links 

 William S. W. Lim on Singapore Government's Infopedia

1932 births
2023 deaths
Architectural theoreticians
Hong Kong emigrants to Singapore
Naturalised citizens of Singapore
Singaporean architects
Harvard Graduate School of Design alumni
Alumni of the Architectural Association School of Architecture
RMIT University alumni